Kiaeria is a genus of haplolepideous mosses (Dicranidae) of the family Dicranaceae. The genus is named after Franz Caspar Kiaer (1835-1893), a Norwegian doctor and bryologist.

Description

The moss is similar to small Dicranum species and form loose to dense cushions. The stems are erect, 1-2 inches high (occasionally higher) and are sparsely fibrous with rhizoids below. The leaves are lanceolate, erect-spreading, sometimes falcate, with full margins, to cut up against the blade tip, with emerging veining. The leaf cells are elongated at the leaf base and smooth, the top sheet portion extends to approximately square and smooth. The leaf wing cells are clearly differentiated.

The spore capsule, at the end of the 7-16 millimeter-long seta is strumose and more or less inclined. The capsule lid is beaked. The peristome teeth are divided in about the middle.

Distribution

Kiaeria species are found in the northern hemisphere in the arctic and subalpine to alpine areas. They grow on silicate rocks and on the ground.

Species

Six species have been described:

 Blytt's kiaeria moss, Kiaeria blyttii
 sickle kiaeria moss, Kiaeria falcata
 Kiaeria glacialis
 Kiaeria pumila
 Kiaeria riparia
 Starke's kiaeria moss, Kiaeria starkei

References 
 Jan-Peter Frahm, Wolfgang Frey, J. Döring. Moosflora. 4th ed., UTB Verlag, 2004, 
 Nebel, Philippi: Die Moose Baden-Württembergs Band 2. 1st ed., Ulmer Verlag, 2005, 
 Wolfgang Frey, Eberhard Fischer, Michael Stech: Bryophytes and seedless Vascular Plants. In: Wolfgang Frey (ed.): Syllabus of Plant Families - A. Engler's Syllabus der Pflanzenfamilien. 13th ed. vol. 3, Borntraeger, Berlin/Stuttgart 2009,

Notes

Moss genera
Dicranales